The 2019 U.S. Open (officially known as the Yonex US Open 2019 for sponsorship reasons) was a badminton tournament which took place at Titan Gym in Fullerton, California, United States, from 9 to 14 July 2019 and had a total purse of $150,000.

Tournament
The 2019 U.S. Open was the thirteenth tournament of the 2019 BWF World Tour and was also a part of the U.S. Open championships which has been held since 1954. This tournament was organized by the USA Badminton and sanctioned by the BWF.

Venue
This international tournament was held at Titan Gym in Fullerton, California, United States.

Point distribution
Below is the point distribution table for each phase of the tournament based on the BWF points system for the BWF World Tour Super 300 event.

Prize money
The total prize money for this tournament was US$150,000. Distribution of prize money was in accordance with BWF regulations.

Men's singles

Seeds

 Lee Dong-keun (quarter-finals)
 Prannoy Kumar (quarter-finals)
 Mark Caljouw (first round)
 Wang Tzu-wei (second round)
 Rajiv Ouseph (first round)
 Parupalli Kashyap (first round)
 Kazumasa Sakai (second round)
 Thomas Rouxel (first round)

Finals

Top half

Section 1

Section 2

Bottom half

Section 3

Section 4

Women's singles

Seeds

 Michelle Li (semi-finals)
 Saena Kawakami (second round)
 Kim Ga-eun (final)
 Zhang Yiman (first round)
 An Se-young (quarter-finals)
 Ayumi Mine (semi-finals)
 Kim Hyo-min (quarter-finals)
 Porntip Buranaprasertsuk (second round)

Finals

Top half

Section 1

Section 2

Bottom half

Section 3

Section 4

Men's doubles

Seeds

 Liao Min-chun / Su Ching-heng (second round)
 Lee Yang / Wang Chi-lin (final)
 Lu Ching-yao / Yang Po-han (quarter-finals)
 Manu Attri / B. Sumeeth Reddy (withdrew)
 Mark Lamsfuß / Marvin Seidel (first round)
 Ko Sung-hyun / Shin Baek-cheol (champions)
 Mohamad Arif Abdul Latif / Nur Mohd Azriyn Ayub (withdrew)
 Jason Ho-shue / Nyl Yakura (second round)

Finals

Top half

Section 1

Section 2

Bottom half

Section 3

Section 4

Women's doubles

Seeds

Finals

Top half

Section 1

Section 2

Bottom half

Section 3

Section 4

Mixed doubles

Seeds

 Mark Lamsfuß / Isabel Herttrich (second round)
 Marvin Seidel / Linda Efler (quarter-finals)
 Ben Lane / Jessica Pugh (semi-finals)
 Thom Gicquel / Delphine Delrue (final)
 Mathias Christiansen / Alexandra Bøje (first round)
 Ronan Labar / Anne Tran (second round)
 Lu Ching-yao / Lee Chia-hsin (quarter-finals)
 Joshua Hurlburt-Yu / Josephine Wu (first round)

Finals

Top half

Section 1

Section 2

Bottom half

Section 3

Section 4

References

External links
 Tournament Link
 Official Website 

U.S. Open Badminton Championships
US Open
US Open
US Open